Michael Paul Wellman (born March 27, 1961) is the Richard H. Orenstein Division Chair of Computer Science and Engineering and  Lynn A. Conway Collegiate Professor of Computer Science and Engineering at the University of Michigan, Ann Arbor.

Wellman received a PhD from the Massachusetts Institute of Technology in 1988 for his work in qualitative probabilistic reasoning and decision-theoretic planning. From 1988 to 1992, Wellman conducted research in these areas at the USAF's Wright Laboratory. For the past 25 years, his research has focused on computational market mechanisms and game-theoretic reasoning methods, with applications in electronic commerce, finance, and cyber-security. As Chief Market Technologist for TradingDynamics, Inc. (now part of Ariba), he designed configurable auction technology for dynamic business-to-business commerce. Wellman previously served as Chair of the ACM Special Interest Group on Electronic Commerce (SIGecom), and as Executive Editor of the Journal of Artificial Intelligence Research. He is a Fellow of the Association for the Advancement of Artificial Intelligence and the Association for Computing Machinery. In 2014 Wellman won the ACM/SIGAI Autonomous Agents Research Award.

See also
 SIGECOM
 Mechanism design
 Reinforcement Learning

References

1961 births
Living people
People from Brooklyn
Fellows of the Association for Computing Machinery
Fellows of the Association for the Advancement of Artificial Intelligence
University of Michigan faculty
MIT School of Engineering alumni
American computer scientists
Scientists from New York (state)